Del is a given name, often a short form (hypocorism) of other names, such as Delmer or Delmas. People bearing the name include:

Men
 Del Andrews (1894–1942), American film director and screenwriter
 Del Baker (1892–1973), American baseball player, coach, and manager
 Del Ballard Jr. (born 1963), American ten-pin bowler
 Del Barber (born 1983), Canadian singer-songwriter, musician, and record producer
 Del Bissonette (1899–1972), American baseball player, coach, and manager 
 Del Bryan (born 1967), English boxer
 Del Close (1934–1999), American actor and writer
 Del Courtney (1910–2006), American jazz bandleader 
 Del Crandall (1930–2021), American baseball player and manager
 Del de Guzman (born 1963), Filipino politician
 Del Dettmar (born 1947), English rock keyboardist
 Del Ennis (1925–1996), American baseball player 
 Del Flanagan (1928–2003), American boxer
 Del Gainer (1886–1947), American baseball player
 Del Harris (born 1937), American basketball coach
 Del Harris (squash player) (born 1969), English former squash player
 Del Henney (1935–2019), British actor
 Del Hodgkinson (born 1939), English rugby league player
 Del Howison (born 1953), American horror writer and actor
 Del McCoury (born 1939), American bluegrass and country musician
 Del Moore (1916–1970), American comedian, actor, and radio announcer
 Del Reeves (1932–2007), American country singer
 Del Thompson (born 1958), American football player
 Del Webb (1899–1974), American real estate developer and baseball owner

Women
 Del Delker (1924–2018), American gospel singer
 Del Harrison, American comedian and actress

Hypocorisms
Lists of people by nickname